Northwest Samar State University is a public university in the Philippines located in Calbayog with extension campus in San Jorge, Samar and the IOMD Campus Online.  It is mandated to provide advanced education, higher technological, professional instruction and training in trade, fishery, agriculture, science, education, commerce, engineering, forestry, nautical courses and other related fields.  It is also mandated to undertake research and extension services, and provide progressive leadership in its areas of specialization.  Its main campus is in Calbayog.

History
In 1948, Calbayog High School was established to cater to the underprivileged students of Calbayog. It existed for seven years until closed due to lack of funding support.

On June 21, 1959, Republic Act 2441 was passed into law to establish Tiburcio Tancingo Memorial Vocational School, named after a prominent judge Tiburcio Tancinco.

On November 14, 1982, Batas Pambansa 304 was passed into law converting Tiburcio Tancinco Memorial Vocational School into Tiburcio Tancinco Memorial Institute of Science and Technology.

On June 14, 1998, Republic Act 8655 then Samar National Agricultural School was renamed Samar State College of Agriculture and Fisheries of would become now San Jorge, Samar campus.

On October 14, 2009, Republic Act No. 9719 was signed into law, renaming Tiburcio Tancinco Memorial Institute of Science and Technology into Northwest Samar State University integrating therewith Samar State College of Agriculture and Forestry located in San Jorge, Samar.

Campuses
 Calbayog (main)
 San Jorge
 IOMD Campus

References
 http://www.chanrobles.com/bataspambansa/bataspambansablg304.html
 http://www.chanrobles.com/republicacts/republicactno9719_pdf.php

State universities and colleges in the Philippines
Universities and colleges in Samar (province)